The Molokai Island Times was one of three newspapers on the Hawaiian island of Moloka'i. It was founded in December 2004 by Brennan Purtzer and Darrell Williams with a subsidy from computer software guru John McAfee, Williams' English cousin, and served as the newest community paper for "The Friendly Isle" of Molokai from 2005–2006, before becoming known as The Molokai Times in January 2007.

It provided news relevant to the Molokai community, along with coverage of sports and politics. The newspaper's stated goal was "to entertain while maintaining the utmost journalistic integrity." The declaration in every issue of the broadsheet publication was, "If it happens here ... it's in here."

Hawaiian Pacific Media's Brennan Purtzer purchased Williams' interest in the company in October 2006. With new operating partner Tim Kline they expanded the capacities of the newspaper in several electronic formats. In January 2007, The Molokai Island Times re-branded itself as The Molokai Times, and was published by Hawaiian Pacific Media, LLC, operated jointly by Tim Kline and Brennan Purtzer.

In June 2007 The Molokai Times hired a new editor to oversee the production of the weekly newspaper. David Lichtenstein, a newspaper professional with over 20 years of journalism and editorial experience, came from Colorado to work on the newspaper.

With the arrival of Lichtenstein, Purtzer moved out of the role of editor, and assumed responsibility for the newspaper's publication, also acting as HPM's CEO and Editor of The Hawaii Golf Journal. The Publisher role at The Molokai Times was taken over by Kline in December 2007, when Purtzer left to temporarily work on the national media team for a 2008 presidential campaign.

In May 2008, the paper was sold to new owner/operators in the form of Lester Keanini and Eric Wong, Molokai-born native Hawaiians.

In September 2008, the newspaper announced it was closing down its operations.

The Molokai Times remains inactive as a Molokai island newspaper (as of 2009) and there is no announced intent to restart either the publication or its internet site. This leaves the island of Molokai with its older news publication, the Molokai Dispatch (published in Kaunakakai) and one other paper published weekly on the east end of the island, the Molokai Advertiser-News.

References 

Defunct newspapers published in Hawaii
Molokai
Publications established in 2004
2004 establishments in Hawaii
Publications disestablished in 2008
2008 disestablishments in Hawaii